Dolichoderus reflexus is a species of ant in the genus Dolichoderus. Described by John S. Clark in 1930, the species is endemic to Australia. Their nests can be found in soil, typically under rocks.

References

Dolichoderus
Hymenoptera of Australia
Insects described in 1930